Herbert James Maryon  (9 March 187414 July 1965) was an English sculptor, conservator, goldsmith, archaeologist and authority on ancient metalwork. Maryon practiced and taught sculpture until retiring in 1939, then worked as a conservator with the British Museum from 1944 to 1961. He is best known for his work on the Sutton Hoo ship-burial, which led to his appointment as an Officer of the Order of the British Empire.

By the time of his mid-twenties Maryon attended three art schools, apprenticed in silversmithing with C. R. Ashbee and worked in Henry Wilson's workshop. From 1900 to 1904 he served as the director of the Keswick School of Industrial Art, where he designed numerous Arts and Crafts works. After moving to the University of Reading and then Durham University, he taught sculpture, metalwork, modelling, casting, and anatomy until 1939. He also designed the University of Reading War Memorial, among other commissions. Maryon published two books while teaching, including Metalwork and Enamelling, and many other articles. He frequently led archaeological digs, and in 1935 discovered one of the oldest gold ornaments known in Britain while excavating the Kirkhaugh cairns.

In 1944 Maryon was brought out of retirement to work in the Sutton Hoo finds. His responsibilities included restoring the shield, the drinking horns, and the iconic Sutton Hoo helmet, which proved academically and culturally influential. Maryon's work, much of which was revised in the 1970s, created credible renderings upon which subsequent research relied; likewise, one of his papers coined the term pattern welding to describe a method employed on the Sutton Hoo sword to decorate and strengthen iron and steel. The initial work ended in 1950, and Maryon turned to other matters. He proposed a widely publicised theory in 1953 on the construction of the Colossus of Rhodes, influencing Salvador Dalí and others, and restored the Roman Emesa helmet in 1955. He left the museum in 1961, a year after his official retirement, and began an around-the-world trip lecturing and researching Chinese magic mirrors.

Early life and education 

Herbert James Maryon was born in London on 9March 1874. He was the third of six surviving children born to John Simeon Maryon, a tailor, and Louisa Maryon (née Church). He had an older brother, John Ernest, and an older sister, Louisa Edith, the latter of whom preceded him in his vocation as a sculptor. Another brother and three sisters were born after him—in order, George Christian, Flora Mabel, Mildred Jessie, and Violet Mary—although Flora Maryon, born in 1878, died in her second year. According to a pedigree compiled by John Ernest Maryon, the Maryons traced back to the de Marinis family, a branch of which left Normandy for England around the 12th century.

After receiving his general education at The Lower School of John Lyon, Herbert Maryon studied from 1896 to 1900 at the Polytechnic (Regent Street), where he received a scholarship and special extension for a third year, as well as at The Slade, Saint Martin's School of Art, and, under the tutelage of Alexander Fisher and William Lethaby, the Central School of Arts and Crafts. He also obtained first class South Kensington certificates in drawing from life, antique, light and shade, and other subjects. Under Fisher in particular, Maryon learned enamelling. Maryon further received a one-year silversmithing apprenticeship in 1898, at C. R. Ashbee's Essex House Guild of Handicrafts, and worked for a period of time in Henry Wilson's workshop. At some point, though perhaps later, Maryon also worked in the workshop of George Frampton, and was taught by Robert Catterson Smith.

Sculpture 

From 1900 until 1939, Maryon held various positions teaching sculpture, design, and metalwork. During this time, and while still in school beforehand, he created and exhibited many of his own works. At the end of 1899 he displayed a silver cup and a shield of arms with silver cloisonné at the sixth exhibition of the Arts and Crafts Exhibition Society, an event held at the New Gallery which also included a work by his sister Edith. The exhibition was reviewed by The International Studio, with Maryon's work singled out as "agreeable".

Keswick School of Industrial Art, 1900–1904 

In March 1900 Maryon became the first director of the Keswick School of Industrial Art. The school had been opened by Edith and Hardwicke Rawnsley in 1884, amid the emergence of the Arts and Crafts movement. It offered classes in drawing, design, woodcarving, and metalwork, and melded commercial with artistic purposes; the school sold items such as trays, frames, tables, and clock-cases, and developed a reputation for quality. Already by May a reviewer for The Studio of an exhibition at the Royal Albert Hall commented that a group of silver tableware by the school was "a welcome departure towards finer craftsmanship". Two of Maryon's designs, she wrote, "were singularly good—a knocker, executed by Jeremiah Richardson, and a copper casket made by Thomas Spark and ornamented by Thomas Clark and the designer". She described the casket's lock as "enamelled in pearly blue and white", and giving "a dainty touch of colour to a form almost bare of ornament, but beautiful in its proportions and lines". At the following year's exhibition three more works by the school were singled out for praise, including a loving cup by Maryon.

Under Maryon's leadership the Keswick School expanded the breadth and range of its designs, and he executed several significant commissions. His best works, wrote a historian of the school, "drew their inspiration from the nature of the material and his deep understanding of its technical limits". They also tended to be in metal. Items like Bryony, a tray centre showing tangled growth concealed within a geometric framework, continued the school's tradition of repoussé work of naturalistic interpretations of flowers, while evoking the vine-like wallpapers of William Morris. These themes were particularly expressed in a 1901 plaque memorialising Bernard Gilpin, unveiled in St Cuthbert's Church, Kentmere; described by the art historian Sir Nikolaus Pevsner as "Arts and Crafts, almost Art Nouveau", the bronze tablet on oak is framed by trees with entwined roots and influenced by a Norse and Celtic aesthetic. Three other commissions in silver—a loving cup, a processional cross, and a challenge shield—were completed towards the end of Maryon's tenure and the school and featured in The Studio and its international counterpart.

Particularly in more utilitarian works, Maryon's designs at the Keswick School tended to emphasise form over design. As he would write a decade later, "[o]ver-insistence on technique, craftsmanship which proclaims 'How clever am I!' quite naturally elbows out artistic feeling. One idea must be the principal one; and if that happens to be technique, the other goes." Design should be determined by intention, he wrote: as an objet or as an object for use. Hot water jugs, tea pots, sugar bowls and other tableware that Maryon designed were frequently raised from a single sheet of metal, retaining the hammer marks and a dull lustre. Many of these were displayed at the 1902 Home Arts and Industries Exhibition, where the school won 65 awards, along with an altar cross designed by Maryon for Hexham Abbey, and were praised for showing "a remarkably good year's work in the finer kinds of craft and decoration". At the same event a year later more than £35 worth of goods were sold, including a copper jug Maryon designed which was acquired by the Manchester School of Art for its Arts and Crafts Museum. On the strength of these and other achievements, Maryon's salary, which in 1902 had amounted in his estimation to between £185 and £200, was raised to £225.

Maryon's four-year tenure at Keswick was assisted by four designers who also taught drawing: G. M. Collinson, Isobel McBean, Maude M. Ackery, and Dorothea Carpenter. Hired from leading art schools and serving for a year each, the four helped the school keep abreast of modern design. Eight full-time workers helped execute the designs when Maryon joined in 1900, rising to 15 by 1903. Maryon also had the help of his sisters: Edith Maryon designed at least one work for the school, a 1901 relief plaque of Hardwicke Rawnsley, while Mildred Maryon, who the 1901 census listed as living with her sister, worked for a time as an enameller at the school. Both Herbert and Mildred Maryon worked on an oxidised silver and enamel casket that was presented to Princess Louise upon her 1902 visit to the Keswick School; Herbert Maryon was responsible for the design and his sister for the enamelling, with the resulting work being termed "of a character highly creditable to the School" in The Magazine of Art. Strife with colleagues eventually led to Maryon's departure. In July 1901 Collinson had left due to a poor working relationship, and Maryon was often in conflict with the school's management committee, which was chaired by Edith Rawnsley and frequently made decisions without his knowledge. When in August 1904 Carpenter, in friction with Maryon, resigned, the committee decided to give Maryon three-months' notice.

Maryon left the school at the end of December 1904. He spent 1905 teaching metalwork at the Storey Institute in Lancaster. That October he published his first article, "Early Irish Metal Work" in The Art Workers' Quarterly. In 1906 Maryon, still listed as living in Keswick, again displayed works—this time a silver cup and silver chalice—for the Arts and Crafts Exhibition Society, held at the Grafton Galleries; one Mrs. Herbert J. Maryon was listed as exhibiting a Sicilian lace tablecloth. At some point towards 1908, Maryon also gave instruction in crafts under the Westmorland County Council.

University of Reading, 1908–1927 

In January 1908, Maryon was appointed teacher of crafts are the University of Reading, effective 10 February; he took over from Julia Bowley (wife of Arthur Lyon Bowley), who resigned as teacher of woodcarving and handicraft. Until 1927, Maryon taught sculpture, including metalwork, modelling, and casting, at the school. He was also the warden of Wantage Hall from 1920 to 1922. Maryon's first book, Metalwork and Enamelling: A Practical Treatise on Gold and Silversmiths' Work and their Allied Crafts, was published in 1912. Maryon described it as eschewing "the artistic or historical point of view", in favor of an "essentially practical and technical standpoint". The book focused on individual techniques such as soldering, enamelling, and stone-setting, rather than the methods of creating works such as cups and brooches. It was well received, as a vade mecum for both students and practitioners of metalworking. The Burlington Magazine for Connoisseurs wrote that Maryon "succeeds in every page in not only maintaining his own enthusiasm, but what is better in communicating it", and The Athenæum declared that his "critical notes on design are excellent". One such note, republished in The Jewelers' Circular in 1922, was a critique of the celebrated sixteenth-century goldsmith Benvenuto Cellini; Maryon termed him "one of the very greatest craftsmen of the sixteenth century, but... a very poor artist", a "dispassionate appraisal" that led a one-time secretary of the Metropolitan Museum of Art to label Maryon not only "the dean of ancient metalwork", but also "a discerning critic". Metalwork and Enamelling went through four further editions, in 1923, 1954, 1959, and posthumously in 1971, along with a 1998 Italian translation, and as of 2020 is still in print by Dover Publications. As late as 1993, a senior conservator at the Canadian Conservation Institute wrote that the book "has not been equalled".

During the First World War Maryon worked at Reading with another instructor, Charles Albert Sadler, to create a centre to train munition workers in machine tool work. Maryon began this work in 1915, officially as organising secretary and instructor at the Ministry of Munitions Training Centre, with no engineering school to build from. The programme targeted women in particular, given the number of men who were serving in the military. By 1918 the centre had five staff members, could accommodate 25 workers at a time, and had trained more than 400. Based on this work, Maryon was elected to the Institution of Mechanical Engineers on 6March 1918.

Maryon displayed a child's bowl with signs of the zodiac at the ninth Arts and Crafts Exhibition Society exhibition in 1910. Following the war, he—like his colleague and friend William Collingwood,—designed several memorials, including the East Knoyle War Memorial in 1920, the Mortimer War Memorial in 1921, and in 1924 the University of Reading War Memorial, a clock tower on the London Road Campus.

Armstrong College, 1927–1939 

In 1927 Maryon left the University of Reading and began teaching sculpture at Armstrong College, then part of Durham University, where he stayed until 1939. At Durham he was both master of sculpture, and lecturer in anatomy and the history of sculpture. Around 1928, Maryon travelled around Europe, from Reading to Denmark, followed by Copenhagen, Gothenburg, Stockholm, Danzig, Warsaw, Vienna, Dresden, Leipzig, Berlin, Hamburg, and elsewhere, returning to lecture on the sculpture observed on the trip. In 1933 he published his second book, Modern Sculpture: Its Methods and Ideals. Maryon wrote that his aim was to discuss modern sculpture "from the point of view of the sculptors themselves", rather than from an "archaeological or biographical" perspective. The book received mixed reviews. To The Art Digest, Maryon "succeeded in trying to make sculpture intelligible to the layman". But his treatment of criticism as secondary to intent meant grouping together artworks of unequal quality. Some critics attacked his taste, with The New Statesman and Nation claiming that "[h]e can enjoy almost anything, and among his 350 odd illustrations there are certainly some camels to swallow," The Bookman that "All the bad sculptors... will be found in Mr. Maryon's book... Most of the good sculptors are here as well (even Henry Moore), but all are equal in Mr. Maryon's eye," and The Spectator that "[t]he few good works which have found their way into the 356 plates look lost and unhappy." Maryon responded with explanations of his purpose, saying that "I do not admire all the results, and I say so," and to one review in particular that "I believe that the sculptors of the world have a wider knowledge of what constitutes sculpture than your reviewer realizes." Other reviews praised Maryon's academic approach. The Times stated that "his book is remarkable for its extraordinary catholicity, admitting works which we should find it hard to defend... with works of great merit," yet added that "[b]y a system of grouping, however, according to some primarily aesthetic aim... their inclusion is justified." The Manchester Guardian praised Maryon for "a degree of natural good sense in his observations that cannot always be said to characterise current art criticism", and stated that "his critical judgments are often penetrating."

At Durham, as at Reading, Maryon was commissioned to create works of art. These included at least two plaques, memorialising George Stephenson in 1929, and Sir Charles Parsons in 1932, as well as the Statue of Industry for the 1929 North East Coast Exhibition, a world's fair held at Newcastle upon Tyne. Depicting a woman with cherubs at her feet, the statue was described by Maryon as "represent[ing] industry as we know it in the North-east—one who has passed through hard times and is now ready to face the future, strong and undismayed". The statue was the subject of "adverse criticism", reported The Manchester Guardian; on the night of 25 October "several hundred students of Armstrong College" tarred and feathered the statue, and were dispersed only with the arrival of eighty police officers.

Maryon expressed an interest in archaeology while at Armstrong. By the early 1930s he was conducting excavations, and frequently brought students to dig along Hadrian's Wall. In 1935 he published two articles on Bronze Age swords, and at the end of the year excavated the Kirkhaugh cairns, two Bronze Age graves at Kirkhaugh, Northumberland. One of the cairns was the nearly 4500-year-old grave of a metalworker, like the grave of the Amesbury Archer, and contained one of the oldest gold ornaments yet found in the United Kingdom; a matching ornament was found during a re-excavation in 2014. Maryon's account of the excavation was published in 1936, and papers on archaeology and prehistoric metalworking followed. In 1937 he published an article in Antiquity clarifying a passage by the ancient Greek historian Diodorus Siculus on how Egyptians carved sculptures; in 1938 he wrote in both the Proceedings of the Royal Irish Academy and The Antiquaries Journal on metalworking during the Bronze and Iron Ages; and in 1939 he wrote articles about an ancient hand-anvil discovered in Thomastown, and gold ornaments found in Alnwick.

Maryon retired from Armstrong College—by then known as King's College—in 1939, when he was in his mid-60s. From 1939 to 1943, at the height of World War II, he was involved in munition work. In 1941 he published a two-part article in Man on archaeology and metallurgy, part I on welding and soldering, and part II on the metallurgy of gold and platinum in Pre-Columbian Ecuador.

British Museum, 1944–1961 

On 11 November 1944 Maryon was recruited out of retirement by the trustees of the British Museum to serve as a Technical Attaché. Maryon, working under Harold Plenderleith's leadership, was tasked with the conservation and reconstruction of material from the Anglo-Saxon Sutton Hoo ship-burial. Widely identified with King Rædwald of East Anglia, the burial had previously attracted Maryon's interest; as early as 1941, he wrote a prescient letter about the preservation of the ship impression to Thomas Downing Kendrick, the museum's Keeper of British and Medieval Antiquities. Nearly four years after his letter, in the dying days of World War II and the finds removed (or about to be removed) from safekeeping in the tunnel connecting the Aldwych and Holborn tube stations, he was assigned what Rupert Bruce-Mitford, who succeeded Kendrick's post in 1954, termed "the real headaches—notably the crushed shield, helmet and drinking horns". Composed in large part of iron, wood and horn, these items had decayed in the 1,300 years since their burial and left only fragments behind; the helmet, for one, had corroded and then smashed into more than 500 pieces. Painstaking work needing keen observation and patience, these efforts occupied several years of Maryon's career. Much of his work has seen revision, but as Bruce-Mitford wrote afterwards, "by carrying out the initial cleaning, sorting, and mounting of the mass of the fragmentary and fragile material he preserved it, and in working out his reconstructions he made explicit the problems posed and laid the foundations upon which fresh appraisals and progress could be based when fuller archaeological study became possible."

Maryon's restorations were aided by his deep practical understandings of the objects he was working on, causing a senior conservator at the Canadian Conservation Institute in 1993 to label Maryon "[o]ne of the finest exemplars" of a conservator whose "wide understanding of the structure and function of museum objects... exceeds that gained by the curator or historian in more classical studies of artefacts." Maryon was admitted as a fellow of the Society of Antiquaries in 1949, and in 1956 his Sutton Hoo work led to his appointment as an Officer of the Order of the British Empire. Asked by Queen Elizabeth II what he did as she awarded him the medal, Maryon responded "Well, Ma'am, I am a sort of back room boy at the British Museum." Maryon continued restoration work at the British Museum, including on Oriental antiquities and the Roman Emesa helmet, before retiring—for a second time—at the age of 87.

Sutton Hoo helmet 

From 1945 to 1946, Maryon spent six continuous months reconstructing the Sutton Hoo helmet. The helmet was only the second Anglo-Saxon example then known, the Benty Grange helmet being the first, and was the most elaborate. Yet its importance had not been realized during excavation, and no photographs of it were taken in situ. Bruce-Mitford likened Maryon's task to "a jigsaw puzzle without any sort of picture on the lid of the box", and, "as it proved, a great many of the pieces missing"; Maryon had to base his reconstruction "exclusively on the information provided by the surviving fragments, guided by archaeological knowledge of other helmets".

Maryon began the reconstruction by familiarising himself with the fragments, tracing and detailing each on a piece of card. After what he termed "a long while", he sculpted a head out of plaster and expanded it outwards to simulate the padded space between helmet and head. On this he initially affixed the fragments with plasticine, placing thicker pieces into spaces cut into the head. Finally, the fragments were permanently affixed with white plaster mixed with brown umber; more plaster was used to fill the in-between areas. The fragments of the cheek guards, neck guard, and visor were placed onto shaped, plaster-covered wire mesh, then affixed with more plaster and joined to the cap. Maryon published the finished reconstruction in a 1947 issue of Antiquity.

Maryon's work was celebrated, and both academically and culturally influential. The helmet stayed on display for over twenty years, with photographs making their way into television programmes, newspapers, and "every book on Anglo-Saxon art and archaeology"; in 1951 a young Larry Burrows was dispatched to the British Museum by Life, which published a full page photograph of the helmet alongside a photo of Maryon. Over the succeeding quarter century conservation techniques advanced, knowledge of contemporaneous helmets grew, and more helmet fragments were discovered during the 1965–69 re-excavation of Sutton Hoo; accordingly, inaccuracies in Maryon's reconstruction—notably its diminished size, gaps in afforded protection, and lack of a moveable neck guard—became apparent. In 1971 a second reconstruction was completed, following eighteen months' work by Nigel Williams. Yet "[m]uch of Maryon's work is valid," Bruce-Mitford wrote. "The general character of the helmet was made plain." "It was only because there was a first restoration that could be constructively criticized," noted the conservation scholar Chris Caple, "that there was the impetus and improved ideas available for a second restoration;" similarly, minor errors in the second reconstruction were discovered while forging the 1973 Royal Armouries replica. In executing a first reconstruction that was reversible and retained evidence by being only lightly cleaned, Maryon's true contribution to the Sutton Hoo helmet was in creating a credible first rendering that allowed for the critical examination leading to the second, current, reconstruction.

After Sutton Hoo 

Maryon finished reconstructions of significant objects from Sutton Hoo by 1946, although work on the remaining finds carried him to 1950; at this point Plenderleith decided the work had been finished to the extent possible, and that the space in the research laboratory was needed for other purposes. Maryon continued working at the museum until 1961, turning his attention to other matters. This included some travel: in April 1954 he visited Toronto, giving lectures at the Royal Ontario Museum on Sutton Hoo before a large audience, and another on "Founders and Metal Workers of the Early World"; the same year he visited Philadelphia, where he was scheduled to appear on an episode of What in the World? before the artefacts were mistakenly carted away to the dump; and in 1957 or 1958, paid a visit to the Gennadeion at the American School of Classical Studies at Athens.

In 1955 Maryon restored the Roman Emesa helmet for the British Museum. It had been found in the Syrian city Homs in 1936, and underwent several failed restoration attempts before it was brought to the museum—"the last resort in these things", according to Maryon. The restoration was published the following year by Plenderleith. Around that time Maryon and Plenderleith also collaborated on several other works: in 1954 they wrote a chapter on metalwork for the History of Technology series, and in 1959 they co-authored a paper on the cleaning of Westminster Abbey's bronze royal effigies.

Publications 

In addition to Metalwork and Enamelling and Modern Sculpture, Maryon authored chapters in volumes one and two of Charles Singer's "A History of Technology" series, and wrote thirty or forty archaeological and technical papers. Several of Maryon's earlier papers, in 1946 and 1947, described his restorations of the shield and helmet from the Sutton Hoo burial. In 1948 another paper introduced the term pattern welding to describe a method of strengthening and decorating iron and steel by welding into them twisted strips of metal; the method was employed on the Sutton Hoo sword among others, giving them a distinctive pattern. 

During 1953 and 1954, his talk and paper on the Colossus of Rhodes received international attention for suggesting the statue was hollow, and stood aside rather than astride the harbour. Made of hammered bronze plates less than a sixteenth of an inch thick, he suggested, it would have been supported by a tripod structure comprising the two legs and a hanging piece of drapery. Although "great ideas" according to the scholar Godefroid de Callataÿ, neither fully caught on; in 1957, Denys Haynes, then the Keeper of Greek and Roman Antiquities at the British Museum, suggested that Maryon's theory of hammered bronze plates relied on an errant translation of a primary source. Maryon's view was nevertheless influential, likely shaping Salvador Dalí's 1954 surrealist imagining of the statue, The Colossus of Rhodes. "Not only the pose," wrote de Callataÿ, "but even the hammered plates of Maryon's theory find [in Dalí's painting] a clear and very powerful expression."

Later years 

Maryon finally left the British Museum in 1961, a year after his official retirement. He donated a number of items to the museum, including plaster maquettes by George Frampton of Comedy and Tragedy, used for the memorial to Sir W. S. Gilbert along the Victoria Embankment. Before his departure Maryon had been planning a trip around the world, and at the end of 1961 he left for Fremantle, Australia, arriving on 1 January 1962. In Perth he visited his brother George Maryon, whom he had not seen in 60 years. From Australia Maryon departed for San Francisco, arriving on 15 February. Much of his North American tour was done with buses and cheap hotels, for, as a colleague would recall, Maryon "liked to travel the hard way—like an undergraduate—which was to be expected since, at 89, he was a young man."

Maryon devoted much of his time during the American stage of his trip to visiting museums and the study of Chinese magic mirrors, a subject he had turned to some two years before. By the time he reached Kansas City, Missouri, where he was written up in The Kansas City Times, he had listed 526 examples in his notebook. His trip included guest lectures, such as his talk "Metal Working in the Ancient World" at the Museum of Fine Arts, Boston on 1May 1962 and the Massachusetts Institute of Technology the day after, and when he came to New York City a colleague later said that "he wore out several much younger colleagues with an unusually long stint devoted to a meticulous examination of two large collections of pre-Columbian fine metalwork, a field that was new to him." Maryon scheduled the trip to end in Toronto, where his son John Maryon, a civil engineer, lived.

Personal life 

In July 1903 Maryon married Annie Elizabeth Maryon (née Stones). They had a daughter, Kathleen Rotha Maryon. Annie Maryon died on 8February 1908. A second marriage, to Muriel Dore Wood in September 1920, produced two children, son John and daughter Margaret. Maryon lived the majority of his life in London, and died on 14 July 1965, at a nursing home in Edinburgh, in his 92nd year. Death notices were published in papers including The Daily Telegraph, The Times, the Montreal Star, the Brandon Sun, and the Ottawa Journal.  Longer obituaries followed in Studies in Conservation, and the American Journal of Archaeology,

Works by Maryon

Books

Articles 

 
  
 Republication of passages from 
  
 Republication of 
  
 
 
 
 
 
 Abstract published as

Other 

  
 Excerpt of a lecture.

Notes

References

Bibliography 
  
  
 
  
  
  
  
 
  
  
 
  
  
  
  
 
  
 
 
 
  
  
  
 
  
 
  
 
 
 
 
  
 
 Includes prefatory essays My Japanese Background and Forty Years with Sutton Hoo by Bruce-Mitford.
 
 
  
  
  
  
  
  
 Identical bio listed in  
  
  
  
  
 
  
  
  
  
  
 
  
  
  
 
 
  
  
 
  
  
  
  
  
  
  
  
  
  
  
  
  
  
  
  
  
  
  
  
  
 
 
  
  
  
 
  
 
  
 
  
  
  
  
 
  
  
  
  
 
  
  
  
 
  
  
  
  
 
  
  
  
  
  
  
  
 
  
  
  
  
  
  
 
  
  
  
  
 
  
  
  
  
  
  
  
  
  
  
  
  
 
 
  
  
  
  
  
  
  
  
  
  
  
  
  
  
  
 
  
  
  
  
 
 
  
 Related:

Colossus articles

External links 

1874 births
1965 deaths
British metalsmiths
British sculptors
British male sculptors
Conservator-restorers
Employees of the British Museum
English goldsmiths
English silversmiths
Fellows of the Society of Antiquaries of London
Officers of the Order of the British Empire
Sutton Hoo